Sunset Mall is a shopping mall located in San Angelo, Texas. The anchor stores are Marshalls, JCPenney, Fitness 1440, Ulta Beauty, two Dillard's stores, Conn's,  There is one vacant anchor store that was once Sears.

History
The mall opened in 1979, featuring JCPenney, Sears, H. J. Wilson Co., Bealls, and Hemphill-Wells. The concourses were designed with fiberglass skylights that let in natural light. One year after the mall opened, its design received an award from the Dallas chapter of American Institute of Architects. Hemphill-Wells was bought out by Dillard's in 1986. H. J. Wilson was later sold to Service Merchandise, which closed in 1999. In 2006, Dillard's opened a second store in the former Service Merchandise building.

Old Navy opened at the mall in 2000 and closed ten years later. A year later, Marshalls moved into the space, while Shoe Dept. was expanded and Ulta Beauty opened in a space vacated by Luby's.

On November 2, 2017, Sears announced that its store would be closing as part of a plan to close 63 stores nationwide. The store closed in January 2018.

References

External links
Sunset Mall official website

Buildings and structures in San Angelo, Texas
Shopping malls in Texas
Shopping malls established in 1979
JLL (company)